The J.D. McDonald House is a historic house in Fremont, Nebraska. It was built in 1888 for J.D. McDonald, a Canadian-born railroad contractor who founded the Fremont Manufacturing Company and served on the board of directors of the Fremont National Bank. He hired M.A. Ecker to design it in the Queen Anne and Romanesque Revival architectural styles.  It has been listed on the National Register of Historic Places since December 10, 1980.  The McDonald family resided in the house until 1898.  The building became the first hospital in Fremont, Nebraska in 1905 under the name Kirby Hospital.

References

National Register of Historic Places in Dodge County, Nebraska
Queen Anne architecture in Nebraska
Romanesque Revival architecture in Nebraska
Houses completed in 1888